Fraziers Bottom is an unincorporated community in Putnam County, West Virginia, United States.  The community was named after a family of Fraziers, who settled the area in the late 18th century after migrating there from present day Virginia. The zip code is 25082. As of 2020, the population is 1,720 people.

Cultural impact
The town was the setting for the film Win a Date with Tad Hamilton.

References

Unincorporated communities in West Virginia
Unincorporated communities in Putnam County, West Virginia
Charleston, West Virginia metropolitan area
Populated places on the Kanawha River